An election of Members of the European Parliament representing Netherlands constituency took place on 4 June 2009. Seventeen parties competed in a D'Hondt type election for the available 25 seats (down from 27). For the first time, all Dutch residents of the Netherlands Antilles and Aruba were also entitled to vote in the election.

Background

Political co-operation 
The Christian Union and SGP formed a common list Christian Union-SGP for the European Parliament election. Moreover, several parties formed an electoral alliance:
 CDA/European People's Party and Christian Union-SGP, with 1,223,773 votes
 VVD/European Liberal-Democrats and Democrats 66, with 1,034,065 votes
 PvdA/European Social-Democrats and GreenLeft, with 952,711 votes

All three alliances would be eligible for a remainder seat, because all the parties involved won a seat in the European Parliament. Without the alliance between the Dutch Labour Party and Greenleft, GreenLeft would have only two seats and PVV would have five seats. The other electoral alliances had no effect on the overall seats awarded.

New electorate 
The Netherlands Antilles and Aruba were granted the right to vote in the European Parliament election by a verdict of the Council of State which stated that it is illegal to differentiate in law between people with Dutch nationality in Europe and outside. The government granted all persons of Dutch nationality voting rights for European elections. Before the verdict, only people who had lived in the Netherlands for 10 years or longer were allowed to vote. This ruling increased the number of people entitled to vote by 210,000. Only 20,944 people registered to vote from the islands in this election. The turnout of registered voters in the Netherlands Antilles and Aruba was 77% (rest of the world 66%.) This new voting right does not change the position of the Netherlands Antilles and Aruba. They are not considered to be part of the European Union and they do not need to adopt European law.

Before this election, people placed under a guardian were not allowed to vote. Usually a person has the status of guardian because the ward is incapable of caring for their own interests. A ruling of the Council of State decided that this was not allowed under the International Covenant on Civil and Political Rights. It is not known how many people this affected, as there is no central register for individuals under guardianship.

Treaty of Lisbon 

Under the Treaty of Lisbon, the Netherlands was to get a 26th seat in the European Parliament. Because this treaty had not yet been ratified by all member states at the time of the elections, this seat could not be given to a party at that time. The State Secretary for the Interior, Ank Bijleveld-Schouten, made a proposal for allocating it if the Lisbon treaty were to be ratified by all member states, but this had not been accepted by parliament at the time of the election. According to the proposal made by the government, the seat would be awarded to the Party for Freedom.

The Party for the Animals contested this proposal, claiming that the minister ignored part of the Electoral Council's opinion. They raised their objection after the official results came in. Under the Electoral Council's opinion, the Party for the Animals should have gained the seat.

Several parties in the States-General had already stated that this changed the election rules after the elections, and, if the rules were to be changed, the opposition had missed their chance by not contesting them before the elections. They had thus de facto agreed to the proposal. Advice had been requested from the Council of State on the matter. If the election had been for 26 seats rather than 25 from the start, the 26th seat would have been awarded to the Party for Freedom. On 9 October, the Dutch cabinet announced that the 26th seat would be awarded to the Party for Freedom. This would give them a total of 5 seats when the Lisbon treaty came into effect.

Treaty of Nice

At present, the exact number of seats allocated to each country is determined by the Treaty of Nice, and is adjusted by the accession treaty of each new member. This last adjustment occurred with the enlargement in 2007. Hence no change to the seats occurs without ratification by all member states. According to the treaties, the maximum number of members in the Parliament is 732. However, allocation does not take into account any enlargements to the European Union expected during the Parliamentary term. Hence, when Romania and Bulgaria joined the union in 2007, the number of seats temporarily rose to 785, but later dropped back to 736 at time of the 2009 election. Because of this, the Netherlands had 27 seats in 2004 but only 25 in 2009.

Numbering of the candidates list

Results

The Christian Democratic Appeal (CDA) remained the biggest party (five seats), despite losing two seats. The biggest winners were the Party for Freedom (up four seats) and Democrats 66 (up two). The biggest loser was the Labour Party, which lost more than half its seats (down four).

Voter turnout was 36.75%, a little lower than in 2004 (39.26%). The highest turnout was in Rozendaal (65.7%) and the lowest in Rucphen (22.3%).

Seat assignment

Electoral quota
The electoral quota is the number of votes needed for one seat.
It is the total valid number of votes divided by the number of seats.
For this election it was 4,553,864 valid votes, divided by 25 seats.
The electoral quota was established as: 182,154

Electoral alliances
The results of the electoral alliances. Both parties of both alliances reached the electoral quota and are eligible for remainder seats.

Assigning full seats
Full seats are assigned by number of votes divided by the electoral quota.
Electoral alliances are marked as a letter, instead of a number.
Any seats left over are not yet assigned to a specific party.

Remainder seats
The remaining, or left over, seats are awarded sequentially to the lists with the highest average number of votes per seat.
Only lists that reached the electoral quota are eligible.

 CDA – European People's Party and Christian Union-SGP electoral alliance is awarded 1 seat.
 P.v.d.A./European Social Democrats and GreenLeft electoral alliance is awarded 1 seat.
 VVD - European Liberal-Democrats and Democrats 66 (D66) electoral alliance is awarded 1 seat.
 SP (Socialist Party) is awarded 1 seat.
 PVV (Party for Freedom) is not awarded any seat, but will get remainder seat 5 when the Treaty of Lisbon is ratified by all EU member states.

Awarding seats within electoral alliances
To decide the seats per party for electoral alliances, the combination quota is first determined.
Combination quota for electoral alliances are determined by the total number valid votes divided by the awarded seats.
The party with the most votes left after the full seats are assigned gets the seat remaining.

List A
For list A, there were 1,223,773 votes divided by 7 seats.
The combination quota was established as: 174,824 votes

List B
For list B, there were 952,711 votes divided by 6 seats.
The combination quota was established as: 158,785 votes

List C
For list C, there were 1,034,065 votes divided by 6 seats.
The combination quota was established as: 172,344 votes

Summary:
 The CDA – European People's Party list was awarded 5 seats.
 The Christian Union-SGP list was awarded 2 seats.
 The P.v.d.A./European Social Democrats list was awarded 3 seats.
 The GreenLeft list was awarded 3 seats.
 The VVD - European Liberal-Democrats list was awarded 3 seats.
 The Democrats 66 (D66) list was awarded 3 seats.

European groups
The Alliance of Liberals and Democrats for Europe became the biggest group in the Netherlands, after an electoral loss for the parties in European People's Party–European Democrats and European Socialists group.

The European Greens–European Free Alliance lost a seat, despite GreenLeft winning a seat. This was because Europe Transparent, which sat in the European Greens-EFA group, did not take part in this election. Newcomer Party for Freedom is not part of a European group and is under Non-Inscrits. The Christian Union-SGP was in the Independence/Democracy group, but this group did not meet the requirements to be a group in the European Parliament and was dissolved. The Christian Union and SGP entered talks with the European Conservatives after the elections. The SGP was asked to change their stance on women's issues, but declined. After that the Christian Union joined the European Conservatives on its own. After 25 years of co-operation, the Christian Union and Reformed Political Party split into two groups in the European parliament.

| style="text-align:center;" colspan="11" | 
|-
|style="background-color:#E9E9E9;text-align:center;vertical-align:top;" colspan="3"|European group
!style="background-color:#E9E9E9" |Seats 2004
!style="background-color:#E9E9E9" |Seats 2009
!style="background-color:#E9E9E9" |Change
|-
| style="background-color:gold;" width=0.3em|
| style="text-align:left;" | Alliance of Liberals and Democrats for Europe
| style="text-align:left;" | ALDE
| style="text-align:right;" | 5
| style="text-align:right;" | 6
| style="text-align:right;" | 1 
|-
| 
| style="text-align:left;" | European People's Party
| style="text-align:left;" | EPP
| style="text-align:right;" | 7
| style="text-align:right;" | 5
| style="text-align:right;" | 2 
|-
| 
| style="text-align:left;" | Progressive Alliance of Socialists and Democrats
| style="text-align:left;" | S&D
| style="text-align:right;" | 7
| style="text-align:right;" | 3
| style="text-align:right;" | 4 
|-
| 
| style="text-align:left;" | The Greens–European Free Alliance
| style="text-align:left;" | Greens-EFA
| style="text-align:right;" | 4
| style="text-align:right;" | 3
| style="text-align:right;" | 1 
|-
| 
| style="text-align:left;" | European United Left–Nordic Green Left
| style="text-align:left;" | EUL-NGL
| style="text-align:right;" | 2
| style="text-align:right;" | 2
| style="text-align:right;" | 0 
|-
| 
| style="text-align:left;" | European Conservatives and Reformists
| style="text-align:left;" | ECR
| style="text-align:right;" | 0
| style="text-align:right;" | 1
| style="text-align:right;" | 1 
|-
| 
| style="text-align:left;" | Europe of Freedom and Democracy
| style="text-align:left;" | EFD
| style="text-align:right;" | 2
| style="text-align:right;" | 1
| style="text-align:right;" | 1 
|-
| 
| style="text-align:left;" | Non-Inscrits
| style="text-align:left;" | NI
| style="text-align:right;" | 0
| style="text-align:right;" | 4(+1)
| style="text-align:right;" | 4(+1) 
|-
|width="350" style="text-align:right;background-color:#E9E9E9" colspan="3"|
|width="30" style="text-align:right;background-color:#E9E9E9"| 27
|width="30" style="text-align:right;background-color:#E9E9E9"| 25(+1)
|width="30" style="text-align:right;background-color:#E9E9E9"| 2(+1) 
|}

Elected members
Twenty members were elected by preference vote.
Twenty-four people got this amount, but not all could be appointed because either the party did not get enough seats or they got no seats.

Below are all the elected members of European parliament for the Netherlands. Members elected by preference votes are in bold.
The following 25 MEPs were officially announced by the Central Electoral Commission on 11 June 2009:

Christian Democratic Appeal
 Wim van de Camp, 579,775 votes (top candidate)
 Ria Oomen-Ruijten, 70,388 votes
 Corien Wortmann-Kool, 48,270 votes
 Esther de Lange, 43,406 votes
 Lambert van Nistelrooij, 41,846 votes

Party for Freedom
 Barry Madlener, 372,060 votes (top candidate)
 Geert Wilders, 334,846 votes (has announced that he will not claim his seat)
 Louis Bontes, 6,751 votes
 Daniël van der Stoep, 5,650 votes

Dutch Labour Party
 Thijs Berman, 372,060 votes (top candidate)
 Emine Bozkurt, 66,385 votes
 Judith Merkies, 18,553 votes

People's Party for Freedom and Democracy
 Hans van Baalen, 367,796 votes (top candidate)
 Jeanine Hennis-Plasschaert, 52,184 votes
 Toine Manders, 34,973 votes

Democrats 66
 Sophie in 't Veld, 433,957 votes (top candidate)
 Marietje Schaake, 18,662 votes
 Gerben-Jan Gerbrandy, 18,107 votes

GreenLeft
 Judith Sargentini, 321,744 votes (top candidate)
 Bas Eickhout, 13,782 votes
 Marije Cornelissen, 14,486 votes

Socialist Party
 Dennis de Jong, 194,359 votes (top candidate)
 Kartika Liotard, 32,426 votes

ChristianUnion – Reformed Political Party
 Peter van Dalen (ChristianUnion), 209,947 votes (top candidate)
 Bastiaan Belder (Reformed Political Party), 53,450 votes

Members not elected, but enough preference votes:
 Christian Democratic Appeal – Maria Martens 38,781 votes. (party did not win enough seats)
 Socialist Party – Nicole van Gemert 23,662 votes. (party did not win enough seats)
 Party for Animals – Natasja Oerlemans 115,472 votes and Marianne Thieme 18,314 votes (party did not win any seat)

MEPs in 2009–2014
Below is a list of members of the European Parliament for the period 2009–2014 as a result of this election.

References 

Netherlands
2009
European Parliament election